Jimena Leguizamón Leal (born 12 May 2005) is a Colombian competitive swimmer. At the 2022 Bolivarian Games, she won gold medals in the 200 metre backstroke and 4×100 metre medley relay and bronze medals in the 200 metre individual medley and 100 metre backstroke. At the 2022 World Aquatics Championships, she placed sixteenth in the 200 metre backstroke and became the first female Colombian swimmer to reach the semifinals stage of competition in the event at a FINA World Aquatics Championships. She won the silver medal in the 200 metre backstroke at the 2021 Junior Pan American Games and two gold medals and two silver medals in individual events at the 2022 South American Youth Games.

Background
Leguizamón was born 12 May 2005 in Bogotá, Colombia. She was diagnosed with asthma when she was 5 years old and started swimming to help mediate the condition.

Career

2021

2021 Junior Pan American Games
As a part of swimming competition at the 2021 Junior Pan American Games, conducted in Cali in November and December, Leguizamón won the silver medal in the 200 metre backstroke with a time of 2:16.85, won a bronze medal in the 4×100 metre medley relay with a final time of 4:16.51, placed fifth in the 100 metre backstroke with a time of 1:04.36, and placed eighth in the preliminaries of the 200 metre individual medley with a 2:24.22. In her heat of the 200-metre individual medley, she placed fourth with a time of 2:24.22, finishing over 10 full seconds ahead of fifth-place finisher and 2020 Olympian Jillian Crooks of the Cayman Islands. Following the Games, she won a gold medal in the 200 metre backstroke at the Junior South American Swimming Championships with a South American record time of 2:16.63 for girls under 18 years of age.

2022

2022 South American Youth Games
At the 2022 South American Youth Games, held in Rosario, Argentina in April and May, Leguizamón won a total of two gold medals and three silver medals. She won her first set of medals on 28 April, the first medal was a silver medal in the 200 metre individual medley with a time of 2:21.51 and the second was a silver medal in the 50 metre backstroke with a time of 30.02 seconds. Her other three medals, she won over the following two days, first winning the gold medal in the 100 metre backstroke with a 1:03.65, then winning a silver medal as part of the 4×100 metre medley relay, followed by a gold medal in the 200 metre backstroke with a 2:15.38. She also placed fourth in the 4×100 metre mixed medley relay on 1 May.

2022 World Aquatics Championships
In the 100 metre backstroke at the 2022 World Aquatics Championships, with pool swimming competition held at Danube Arena in Budapest, Hungary in June, Leguizamón placed 26th with a time of 1:03.16. Four days later, she swam a 2:16.38 in the preliminaries of the 200 metre backstroke and qualified for the semifinals ranking sixteenth. In the evening semifinals, she became the first female Colombian to compete in the semifinals stage of competition of the 200 metre backstroke at a FINA World Aquatics Championships, placing sixteenth with a time of 2:15.11.

2022 Bolivarian Games

Nine days later, Leguizamón won her first medal in swimming competition at the 2022 Bolivarian Games, held in Valledupar, a bronze medal in the 200 metre individual medley with a time of 2:21.78. For her first medal the following day, she won the bronze medal in the 100 metre backstroke with a time of 1:04.29 in the final, finishing 0.56 seconds behind gold medalist McKenna DeBever of Peru and 0.46 seconds behind silver medalist Krystal Lara of the Dominican Republic. Her second medal of the day was a gold medal in the 4×100 metre medley relay, where she helped achieve a first-place finish in 4:13.70 along with relay teammates Valentina Becerra, Karen Durango, and Stefania Gómez. In her final event of the Games, the 200 metre backstroke the following day, she won the gold medal in a new Games record time of 2:16.76.

On 6 July, the day after the completion of the Games, Colombian newspaper El Tiempo dubbed Leguizamón as an emerging talent, specifically in regards to her potential to compete at the 2024 Summer Olympics.

2022 World Junior Championships
Leguizamón was one of six Colombian swimmers who entered to compete at the 2022 FINA World Junior Swimming Championships, held in August and September in Lima, Peru. Starting on day one in the preliminaries of the 100 metre backstroke, she finished in a time of 1:04.46, ranking 18th across all preliminary heats and not advancing to the semifinals. On day two, she split a 1:04.47 for the butterfly leg of the 4×100 metre mixed medley relay, helping achieve an eleventh-place finish in 4:08.10. The next day, she placed fifteenth in the 200 metre backstroke with a time of 2:19.90. Day four of competition, she qualified for her first final of the Championships in the preliminaries of the 200 metre individual medley, where she ranked eighth with a time of 2:23.74, which was less than 10 seconds behind first-ranked Mio Narita of Japan. In the final, she increased her time to a 2:25.52 and placed eighth.

2022 South American Games

In August, Leguizamón was named to the Colombia roster in swimming for the senior 2022 South American Games, to be held in October in Asunción, Paraguay. For her individual events as part of pool swimming competition, she entered to compete in the 100 metre backstroke, 200 metre backstroke, and 200 metre individual medley. In the 200 metre individual medley on 2 October, she was the highest-placing female swimmer from Colombia in the final, finishing sixth with a time of 2:25.59. The following day, she qualified for the final of the 100 metre backstroke with a time of 1:04.10 in the morning preliminary heats. In the evening final, she lowered her time to a 1:03.94 and tied for fifth-place. Later in the same session, she won a bronze medal as part of the 4×100 metre medley relay, helping finish third in a time of 4:12.08. On the third day, she withdrew from the 200 metre backstroke prior to the start of competition.

International championships (50 m)

Personal best times

Long course metres (50 m pool)

See also
 Swimming at the 2021 Junior Pan American Games

References

External links
 

2005 births
Living people
Colombian female swimmers
Female backstroke swimmers
Sportspeople from Bogotá
21st-century Colombian women
Competitors at the 2022 South American Games
South American Games medalists in swimming
South American Games bronze medalists for Colombia